The Riverside Yacht Club is a private, recreational yacht club located in the Riverside neighborhood of Greenwich, Connecticut, with access to Long Island Sound. It is the second oldest yacht club in Connecticut.

History

The Riverside Yacht Club was founded in 1888 by George I. Tyson, a prominent and wealthy summer resident of Riverside, CT, and the owner of the yacht Nirvana. Using his own money and waterfront property, Tyson built the first clubhouse in 1889 on the eastern shore of Cos Cob Harbor near the entrance of the Mianus River. He became the first Commodore, a post he held for eight years.

For a short period during the early 1890s, the club met in winter quarters in New York City, and by the late 1920s, the club purchased part of Tyson's Riverside property. In 1929, they completed construction of their present clubhouse.

References

External
 Riverside Yacht Club
 Some of the Oldest Yacht Clubs of New York
 1890s Yacht Photography of J.S. Johnston

1888 establishments in Connecticut
Buildings and structures in Greenwich, Connecticut
Clubhouses in Connecticut
Sailing in Connecticut
Sports clubs established in 1888
Yacht clubs in the United States